Chiquián (Quechua Chiqllan) is a town in central Peru. It is the capital of the Bolognesi Province in the Ancash Region. Its nickname is "the mirror of the sky" [el espejito del cielo in Spanish].

References

Populated places in the Ancash Region